Nectophrynoides pseudotornieri is a species of toad in the family Bufonidae. It is endemic to the Uluguru Mountains in eastern Tanzania. Common names pseudo forest toad and false Tornier's viviparous toad have been proposed for it. Its specific name refers to its similarity to Nectophrynoides tornieri.

Description
The parotoid glands are present but indistinct. The tympanum is absent. The fingers and the toes are partially webbed and have truncated discs on their tips. The dorsum is rough with small tubercles and is tan to golden in colour, with darker markings. Sometimes there are golden flecks on the sides. The lower surfaces are cream, with some dots under the throat. The eyes are golden.

Habitat and conservation
It probably is ovoviviparous as other Nectophrynoides, giving birth to tiny toadlets.

This species is restricted to a single location within the Uluguru North Forest Reserve. Though this gives it some level of protection, habitat loss occurs inside the reserve and is threatening this species.

References

pseudotornieri
Frogs of Africa
Amphibians of Tanzania
Endemic fauna of Tanzania
Amphibians described in 2004
Taxonomy articles created by Polbot